Kiss is a Telugu romantic comedy film. Released on 12 September 2013, the film stars Adivi Sesh and Priya Banerjee. The film is directed by Adivi Sesh and produced by Saikiran Adivi.

Cast
 Adivi Sesh as Sunny
 Priya Banerjee as Priya
 Chandra Adivi as Priya's Father
 Shafi Moin as Murthy
 Bharath Reddy as Ravi
 Anand Batchu as Gopi
 Bhanu Yenamandra as Lakshmi
 RamKrishna Kondamudi as Mahesh
 Ujwal Kasthala as Kumar
 Veronica Valencia as Angela

Soundtrack

Music is composed by Sricharan Pakala and released on Madhura Audio label, while Pete Wonder composed two songs.

Critical reception
Kiss was rated 2.5 out of 5 stars by Rediff.com.

References

External links 
 

2013 films
2013 romantic comedy films
Indian romantic comedy films
2010s Telugu-language films
Films scored by Sricharan Pakala